Brian Ebejer (born March 21, 1974), known professionally as Edsel Dope, is an American musician who is the lead singer, rhythm guitarist and main songwriter for nu metal/industrial metal band Dope. Dope was founded in 1997 by Edsel and his brother Simon (keyboards) in New York City.

Edsel co-produced all of Dope's albums. On Felons and Revolutionaries, Dope's first album released in 1999, Edsel played and programmed most of the musical instruments.

In 2019, a new lead vocalist and rhythm guitarist joined Static-X under the moniker Xer0, which led to speculation and rumors that it was Edsel Dope. Edsel has denied that he is Xer0.

Personal life 
Edsel Dope is engaged and has a daughter born in 2020.

References

External links 
 
 
 

1974 births
21st-century American singers
21st-century American guitarists
21st-century American keyboardists
21st-century American male singers
Alternative metal musicians
American heavy metal singers
American heavy metal keyboardists
American heavy metal guitarists
American industrial musicians
American male guitarists
American multi-instrumentalists
American male singer-songwriters
American people of German descent
Dope (band) members
Guitarists from New York City
Heavy metal keyboardists
Living people
Nu metal singers
Pigface members
Rhythm guitarists
Singers from New York City
Singer-songwriters from New York (state)